Taavi Rõivas' first cabinet was the cabinet of Estonia from  to . It was a coalition cabinet of  free market liberal Estonian Reform Party and Social Democratic Party.

Ministers

Resignations 
On 3 November 2014 Minister of Finance, Jürgen Ligi, resigned due of public pressure after scandalous Facebook post in which he insulted the Minister of Education and Research Jevgeni Ossinovski. On the same day Maris Lauri became the new Minister of Finance.

Also on 3 November 2014 Minister of Foreign Affairs, Urmas Paet, resigned to become an MP in the European Parliament.

See also
Politics of Estonia
Lists of office-holders

References

External links
Official Website of Estonian Government

Cabinets of Estonia
2014 establishments in Estonia
2015 disestablishments in Estonia
Cabinets established in 2014
Cabinets disestablished in 2015